The following is a list of stadiums in Wales, in order by capacity. The list only includes stadiums and grounds that have been built and remain in use, with a capacity of at least 2,000.

See also
List of football clubs in Wales
List of football stadiums in England
List of football stadiums in Scotland
List of association football stadiums by capacity
List of British stadiums by capacity
List of European stadiums by capacity

References

 
 
 
 
Wales
Stadiums
Wales